Pimhill is a civil parish in Shropshire, England.  It contains 67 listed buildings that are recorded in the National Heritage List for England.  Of these, twelve are at Grade II*, the middle of the three grades, and the others are at Grade II, the lowest grade.  The parish is to the northwest of Shrewsbury, it contains the villages of Albrighton, Atcham, Fitz, Leaton, Merrington and Preston Gubbals and smaller settlements, and is otherwise rural.  In the parish are a former manor house and seven country houses that are listed, together with structures associated with them.  Otherwise, most of the listed buildings are smaller houses, cottages, farmhouses and farm buildings, the older of which are timber framed, or have timber-framed cores.  The other listed buildings include churches and items in the churchyards, a private chapel, a group of almshouses, an eyecatcher, a war memorial, and five mileposts,
 

Key

Buildings

References

Citations

Sources

Lists of buildings and structures in Shropshire